HRFC may refer to:

Hackney RFC
Hampton Rovers Football Club
Harpenden RFC
Harvard Rugby Football Club
Havant RFC
Haverfordwest RFC
Helston RFC
Highfield Rangers F.C.
Halifax Rugby Football Club (Halifax, Nova Scotia)